Agriocnemis argentea  is a species of damselfly in the family Coenagrionidae,
commonly known as a silver wisp. 
It is a small damselfly; the male, when mature, is covered in a white pruinescence.
It is endemic to northern Australia
where it inhabits both still and flowing waters.

Etymology
The species name argentea is a Latin word meaning the colour of silver. In 1906 Robin Tillyard named this species of damselfly after the beautiful silvery white bloom covering of mature adults, which when flying ... appears as a bright silver streak, darting in and out of the grass.

Gallery

See also
 List of Odonata species of Australia

References 

Coenagrionidae
Odonata of Australia
Insects of Australia
Endemic fauna of Australia
Taxa named by Robert John Tillyard
Insects described in 1906
Damselflies